Cheshmeh Khan (also Romanized as Cheshmeh Khān; also known as Qal‘eh-ye Cheshmeh Khān) is a village in Golestan Rural District, in the Central District of Jajrom County, North Khorasan Province, Iran.

Population
At the 2006 census, its population was 474, in 128 families.

References 

Populated places in Jajrom County